"I Don't Want to Get Well" is a World War I era song released sometime between 1917 and 1918. Harry Pease and Howard Johnson wrote the lyrics. Harold Jentes composed the music. Leo Feist, Inc. of New York City published the song. Rosenbaum Studios designed the sheet music cover. It features a Red Cross nurse checking the pulse of a wounded soldier as he lies in his hospital bed. The two look at each other longingly. A battle is seen through the window. It was written for both voice and piano.

Vocalist Arthur Fields and Grace Woods recorded the song in 1918. It was issued by Edison Blue Amberol. Eddie Cantor popularized the song.

The song is about a soldier who does not want to get better because he has fallen in love with his nurse. The soldier sends a letter to his worried friend, assuring him that getting shot was the best thing that happened to him. The friend then decides to head to war and hopes he gets injured too. The two choruses are as follows:

The sheet music can be found at Pritzker Military Museum & Library.

See also
Malingering

References

Bibliography
Vogel, Frederick G. World War I Songs: A History and Dictionary of Popular American Patriotic Tunes, with Over 300 Complete Lyrics. Jefferson: McFarland & Company, Inc., 1995.

External links
 View the song MP3 and sheet music here.

1917 songs
Songs of World War I
Songs with lyrics by Howard Johnson (lyricist)
Eddie Cantor songs